Yves Courrière, real name Gérard Bon (12 October 1935 – 8 May 2012) was a French writer, biographer and journalist.

Biography 
As a child Courrière read Albert Londres, Oscar Wilde and became passionate about adventure stories. As a journalist, in 1957 he joined the editorial staff of Radio-Luxembourg and participated in Armand Jammot's 10 Millions d'auditeurs, first radio magazine of the post-war period.

He was then sent to report in 1958 to follow the voyages of General de Gaulle to Africa, and went to countries affected by armed conflicts, civil wars or revolutions, notably in India, the Middle East, and Algeria. He covered the Algerian war and obtained the Albert Londres Prize in 1966 for his articles on Latin America.

From these events, Courrière derived a monumental work that is still being referred to, a landmark in its proximity to the end of the conflict as well as the quality of the sources he obtained.

Courrière covered the Eichmann's trial in 1961, the inaugural crossing of the France in 1962, imposing himself as one of the great signatures of journalism. He decided from 1968 to stop his activity as reporter to dedicate himself to a career of writer. In particular, he published novels and biographies of emblematic personalities from the first half of the twentieth century such as Joseph Kessel, Jacques Prévert, Roger Vailland or Pierre Lazareff.

In 1972, along director , he realized the first documentary devoted to the war in Algeria. This film is considered the reference on this conflict.

Meeting with Roger Vailland 
Courrière met Roger Vailland the day on which the latter received the Prix Goncourt for his novel The Law in December 1957. Roger Vailland was still under the spell of the break with "his communist season" where he felt "like dead" he wrote in his Écrits intimes. To get him out of the depression into which he was falling, his wife Elisabeth took him to his country, Italy, in the Apulia, that hard region, with the crystallized relations he describes so well in his novel.

They saw themselves episodically, too caught up in their activities as great reporters. In the spring of 1961, they met in Jerusalem to cover the Eichmann's trial. There, Vailland introduced him to his friend Joseph Kessel whom he had known before the war at Paris-Soir and who became for Courrière an exemplary man of which he will write a very documented biography like that which he devoted to Roger Vailland in 1991.

Works 
 La Guerre d'Algérie (4 volumes published by Fayard and reissued in two volumes in 2001: La guerre d'Algérie 1957–1962,  and La guerre d'Algérie 1954-1957)
1968: Les Fils de la Toussaint
1969: Le Temps des léopards
1970: L'Heure des colonels
1971: Les Feux du désespoir
1971–1974 Historia Magazine - La Guerre d'Algérie , Éditions Tallandier,  (112 issues)
1974:  , Fayard
1974: L'Homme qui court, Fayard
1979: Normandie Niemen, Presses de la Cité, 
1985: Joseph Kessel ou Sur la piste du lion, Plon 
1987: Les Excès de la passion, Plon
1987: Le Démon de l'aventure, Plon
1991: , Plon
1995: Pierre Lazareff ou le vagabond de l'actualité, Éditions Gallimard,
1999: Les Aubarèdes, roman, Presses de la Cité, 
2000: Jacques Prévert. En vérité, Gallimard, 
2003: Éclats de vie, mémoires, éditions Fayard,

References

External links 
 Yves Courrière on Banelio
 Yves Courrière : guerre d'Algérie on INA.fr (22 September 1971)
 Décès du journaliste Yves Courrière, spécialiste de la guerre d'Algérie on Le Parisien (9 May 2012)
 le décès d'Yves Courrière, journaliste-historien de la guerre d'Algérie dans les années 1960-1970 on Études coloniales

20th-century French journalists
20th-century French writers
21st-century French writers
French biographers
People of the Algerian War
Joseph Kessel Prize recipients
Albert Londres Prize recipients
Winners of the Prix Broquette-Gonin (literature)
1935 births
Writers from Paris
2012 deaths